Maja Milutinović (born 2 October 1987) is a former Montenegrin basketball player.

References

External links
Profile at eurobasket.com

1987 births
Living people
Sportspeople from Podgorica
Montenegrin women's basketball players
Shooting guards
ŽKK Voždovac players